Cooper Manufacturing Co. v. Ferguson, 113 U.S. 727 (1885), was a suit regarding the legitimacy of a sale of a steam engine and other machinery in the State of Ohio.

Background
The plaintiff, which was a corporation organized and existing under the laws of the State of Ohio, with its principal place of business at Mount Vernon, Ohio, on February 22, 1880 at the County of Larimer, in the State of Colorado, entered into a contract in writing of that date with the defendants, who were citizens of Colorado, by which it was agreed that the plaintiff should sell to the defendants, and deliver to them on the cars at Mount Vernon, in the State of Ohio, a steam engine and other machinery, in consideration whereof the defendants were to pay the plaintiff the price stipulated in the contract for such machinery.

A suit was brought by the plaintiff on August 10, 1880, to recover of the defendants damages for their breach of the contract.

The defendants, among other defenses, first pleaded that when the contract was entered into, the plaintiff had not filed the certificate required by Colorado § 23 of the act of 1877; and second, that at the time of making the contract, the plaintiff did not have a known place of business in the State of Colorado, and did not have an authorized agent or agents in the state upon whom process might be served.

The plaintiff demurred to both these answers because they did not state facts sufficient to constitute a defense to the action. Upon the hearing of the demurrer, the judges of the circuit court were divided in opinion, and the presiding judge being of opinion that the demurrer should be overruled, it was overruled accordingly, and the plaintiff electing to stand by its demurrer, judgment was entered against it dismissing its suit, and for costs. By the present writ of error, the plaintiff brings that judgment under review.

Decision
The certificate of division of opinion recites the facts above set forth, and states the question upon which the judges differed to be:

Justice Woods delivered the opinion of the Court:

Justice Matthews and Justice Blatchford concurred, on different grounds from those stated in the opinion:

In the opinion of the court, there was error in the judgment of the circuit court, the judgment should be reversed and remanded for further proceedings.

And it was so ordered.

See also
List of United States Supreme Court cases, volume 113

References

External links
 

United States Constitution Article One case law
United States Supreme Court cases
United States Supreme Court cases of the Waite Court
United States Commerce Clause case law
1885 in United States case law
Knox County, Ohio
Larimer County, Colorado